Lake Mills is a city in Jefferson County, Wisconsin, United States. The population was 6,211 at the 2020 census. The city is located partially within the Town of Lake Mills.

History
Lake Mills occupies the east shore of Rock Lake. The area was first settled by Captain Joseph Keyes. He called it "Lake Mills", after building a saw mill and grist mill using power from nearby Rock Lake.

Lake Mills was chartered in 1836, and the first building was built in 1837. The village of Lake Mills incorporated in 1852 out of the surrounding town of Lake Mills. In 1866 the village changed its name to "Tyranena", but changed it back again to "Lake Mills" the next year. (Tyranena is supposedly an indigenous name meaning "sparkling waters".)

Geography
Lake Mills is located at  (43.080108, -88.909209).

Demographics

2010 census
As of the census of 2010, there were 5,708 people, 2,319 households, and 1,503 families living in the city. The racial makeup of the city was 96.1% White, 0.7% African American, 0.2% Native American, 0.5% Asian, 1.2% from other races, and 1.3% from two or more races. Hispanic or Latino of any race were 3.8% of the population.

There were 2,319 households, of which 32.4% had children under the age of 18 living with them, 52.4% were married couples living together, 8.7% had a female householder with no husband present, 3.7% had a male householder with no wife present, and 35.2% were non-families. 28.2% of all households were made up of individuals, and 11.6% had someone living alone who was 65 years of age or older. The average household size was 2.42 and the average family size was 3.00.

The median age in the city was 37.2 years. 24.9% of residents were under the age of 18; 7% were between the ages of 18 and 24; 28.8% were from 25 to 44; 25.7% were from 45 to 64; and 13.5% were 65 years of age or older. The gender makeup of the city was 48.8% male and 51.2% female.

2000 census
As of the census of 2000, there were 4,843 people, 1,924 households, and 1,289 families living in the city. The population density was 1,415.6 people per square mile (546.8/km2). There were 2,065 housing units at an average density of 603.6 per square mile (233.1/km2). The racial makeup of the city was 97.54% White, 0.17% Black or African American, 0.25% Native American, 0.87% Asian, 0.41% from other races, and 0.76% from two or more races. 2.33% of the population were Hispanic or Latino of any race.

There were 1,924 households, out of which 33.8% had children under the age of 18 living with them, 56.0% were married couples living together, 8.0% had a female householder with no husband present, and 33.0% were non-families. 26.8% of all households were made up of individuals, and 13.0% had someone living alone who was 65 years of age or older. The average household size was 2.49 and the average family size was 3.05.

In the city, the population was spread out, with 27.2% under the age of 18, 6.6% from 18 to 24, 31.0% from 25 to 44, 20.8% from 45 to 64, and 14.5% who were 65 years of age or older. The median age was 36 years. For every 100 females, there were 92.9 males. For every 100 females age 18 and over, there were 91.1 males.

The median income for a household in the city was $44,132, and the median income for a family was $54,131. Males had a median income of $36,394 versus $24,635 for females. The per capita income for the city was $21,929. About 5.3% of families and 7.3% of the population were below the poverty line, including 8.9% of those under age 18 and 6.1% of those age 65 or over.

Media
Lake Mills is home to a weekly newspaper, The Lake Mills Leader.

Education 
The Lake Mills Area School District maintains an elementary school, a middle school, and Lake Mills High School.

St. Paul Lutheran School (3K-8) and Lakeside Lutheran High School are two Christian schools of the Wisconsin Evangelical Lutheran Synod in Lake Mills.

Notable people

Mel J. Cyrak, Wisconsin State Representative
Palmer F. Daugs, Wisconsin State Representative
Ernst F. Detterer, artist
Nelson H. Falk, Wisconsin State Representative
William Everson, Wisconsin State Representative
Charles Greenwood, Wisconsin State Representative
Carleton Bruns Joeckel, librarian, author, and advocate for public libraries
Theodore S. Jones, Wisconsin State Representative
Laura L. Kiessling, chemist
Louis Wescott Myers, Chief Justice of the California Supreme Court
Charles Phillips, Wisconsin State Representative
Hal Raether, MLB pitcher
Jim Wilson, Oklahoma state senator

References

External links
 City of Lake Mills
 Lake Mills Main Street Program
 Lake Mills Area Chamber of Commerce
 Sanborn fire insurance maps:  1892 1898 1903 1912

Cities in Wisconsin
Cities in Jefferson County, Wisconsin